The Baltimore School for the Arts (BSA) is a public performing arts high school located in Mount Vernon, Baltimore, Maryland, United States and is part of the Baltimore City Public Schools system. Established in 1979, The Baltimore School for the Arts offers art concentrations in vocal music, instrumental music, acting, theater production, dance, visual arts and film. The high school has produced numerous "Presidential Scholars" in the Arts and its students have gone on to attend major conservatories and Ivy League Schools.

In 2020, BSA was named a Silver Medal School by the U.S. News & World Report magazine and was ranked 1,173th nationally and 29th in the state of Maryland (first overall in Baltimore City).

History

In 1979, the President of the Board of School Commissioners authored a Charter creating the Baltimore School for the Arts. In the form of a resolution of the School Board, this Charter followed many years of effort to create an arts high school, including a 1978 recommendation of a special Task Force appointed and given strong support by then Mayor William Donald Schaefer, (1921–2011), [served 1971–1986]; [later Governor of Maryland, 1987–1995, Comptroller of Maryland, 1999–2007]. The BSA was created as part of the Baltimore City Public Schools system, however the charter provided the BSA with the structure and the authority to design and implement policies and programs necessary to be successful in its mission as a pre-professional arts high school. The charter stated "that it differ from other Baltimore city high schools by training students with potential for careers in the performing and visual arts."

Mission

The Baltimore School for the Arts is a school that intends to prepare its students for careers in the arts. The school provides qualified students with training in one of five arts disciplines: music (vocal/instrumental), visual arts, theatre (acting/stage design and production), dance, or film in combination with a comprehensive, college preparatory academic program. The theater and music majors are split into two groups each: for the theater department, there is both acting and Stage Design and Production, and the music department is split into vocal and instrumental.

A further mission of the school is to serve as an arts resource for the Baltimore community by offering performances, educational workshops and extensive after-school training in the arts to Baltimore children. This is offered through a program called TWIGS, which is open to 2nd–8th graders.

Arts

The Baltimore School for the Arts is a four-year public high school that provides young people with intensive, pre-professional training in the arts within the context of a comprehensive, college preparatory academic curriculum. Working with a distinguished faculty, students pursue any one of five disciplines—the visual arts, music (vocal or instrumental), theater (acting or theater production), dance and film—in an environment that emphasizes professionalism and scholarship. In addition, the school maintains artistic relationships with local organizations such as the Baltimore Symphony Orchestra, Center Stage, the Hippodrome Foundation, and the Walters Museum.

Academics 
Students learn a rigorous college-preparatory curriculum built on the core values of a liberal arts education. Despite admissions being based entirely on artistic review, BSA has a graduation and college acceptance rate close to 100 percent. Alumni go on to attend the nation's most distinguished colleges, universities, art schools, liberal arts colleges, and conservatories.

Admission 
About 400 students attend the school, coming from public and private schools in and around Baltimore. Students are accepted by an audition or portfolio review only– without regard to grades or academic performance. Rising 9th and 10th graders may apply to attend. Of the 1,000 or so students that audition each year, about 115 are accepted for enrollment.

Campus and facilities 
Situated in Mount Vernon, a historic cultural district immediately north of downtown Baltimore, BSA is located in two buildings on the corner of Madison Avenue and Cathedral Street. It occupies the former Alcazar Hotel and a historic brownstone, specially designed to educate students for future careers in the arts. Workspaces consist of music practice rooms, art and dance studios, a film editing lab, a costume/scene shop, and a state-of-the-art Center for Collaborative Arts and Technology (CCAT) located in the third floor library. Performance spaces include a black box theater, a recital hall, an art gallery and a theater for larger performances and galas.

In media

The school in the film 2006 film Step Up was a fictionalized version of BSA, called The Maryland School for the Arts. There are some significant differences between the institution portrayed in the film and the real school, and some parts of the movie were filmed in the school.
The Maryland School for the Arts also provided the setting for the 2008 film sequel to Step Up, Step Up 2 the Streets although most of the actual filming of the movie did not take place inside BSA.

Notable alumni

 Jada Pinkett Smith, actress
 Mia Brownell, artist
 Christian Siriano, Fashion designer and Project Runway winner
 Tracie Thoms, actress
 Makeba Riddick, songwriter
 Josh Charles – Actor
 Antonio Hart, Jazz saxophonist
 Katherine Needleman, classical oboist
 Larry Gilliard Jr., actor
 Stefania Dovhan, Soprano
 Sara VanDerBeek, photographer
 Shalita Grant, actress
Shinique Smith, Painter, sculptor, Installation and Video Artist
 Jacqueline Green, American ballet dancer
 Bresha Webb, actress
 Moses Ingram, actress
 Rachel Hilson, actress
 Tupac Shakur, Artist

References

External links 

 
 Maryland Report Card – Baltimore School for the Arts
 Baltimore School for the Arts at Baltimore City Schools

Art schools in Maryland
Public high schools in Maryland
Magnet schools in Maryland
Public schools in Baltimore
Schools of the performing arts in the United States
Educational institutions established in 1979
1979 establishments in Maryland
Mount Vernon, Baltimore